William Goodell Frost (1854–1938) was a Greek scholar and president of Berea College from 1890 to 1920.  He is credited with coining the phrase "Appalachian American."

Biography
William Goodell Frost was born in Le Roy, New York on July 2, 1854, to Rev. Lewis P. Frost, and Maria Goodell Frost, abolitionist conductors on the Underground Railroad. His grandfather William Goodell was also a notable abolitionist and temperance supporter, and Frost's aunt, Lavinia Goodell, was the first woman licensed to practice law in Wisconsin.

Frost graduated from Oberlin College in Ohio in 1876 and served as a professor of Greek at Oberlin and was ordained as a Congregationalist minister.  Frost turned down the presidency of Berea College in 1889 before accepting in 1892.  While serving as president, Frost coined the term "Appalachian American" when the school changed its mission from educating black and white students together to simply educating "Appalachian Americans" in response to the segregationist 1904 Day Law and Supreme Court ruling in Berea College v. Kentucky, and Berea then formed and funded the Lincoln Institute in Louisville for African American students. Frost stepped down as president of Berea in 1920.

He died at his home on the college campus on September 11, 1938, and was buried at Berea Cemetery.

References

External links 
 

1854 births
1938 deaths
Academics from New York (state)
American classical scholars
Berea College faculty
Heads of universities and colleges in the United States
Oberlin College alumni
People from Le Roy, New York